La Toile Daligram was a work created in 1972 by Salvador Dalí (May 11, 1904 – January 23, 1989), a Spanish artist best known for his surrealist work.

External links
 Daligram
 La collection Daligramme

Modern paintings
Paintings by Salvador Dalí
1972 paintings